Brierley Groom is an architecture practice in York, England, founded in 1750 by architect John Carr, making it the longest running practice in the United Kingdom, and one of the oldest in the world. It was once run by Walter Brierley, known for having created over 300 buildings in the York area and across the north of England. The company has won several design awards. The practice operates from an office in York and is currently owned by brothers, partners and chartered architects Greg and Matthew Groom.

Principals

 John Carr (1723–1807)
 Peter Atkinson (1735–1805)
 Peter Atkinson II (1776–1838)
 John Bonas Atkinson (1807–1874)
 William Atkinson (1810–1887)
 James Demaine (1842–1911)
 Walter Henry Brierley (1862–1926)
 James Harvey Rutherford (1874–1946)
 John Stuart Syme (1872–1958)
 Cecil Leckenby (1891–1977)
 John K Keighley (1924–2003)
 David A Leckenby (1925–2012)
 Keith Groom (1939–1999)
 Gregory C Groom (1965-)
 Matthew R Groom (1971-)

Notable buildings
1771 - Harewood House
1896 - Church of St Mary, Goathland
1911 - Sledmere House - renovation by Walter Brierley after being gutted by fire
1927 - Goddards House and Garden
1991 - Scalby Mills ticket office - northern terminus of Scarborough Bay Railway
2016 - Scarborough lifeboat station
2017 - Bridlington lifeboat station

References

Architecture firms based in York
Companies based in York
British companies established in 1750
1750 establishments in England